Agonopterix invenustella is a moth in the family Depressariidae. It was described by Hans-Joachim Hannemann in 1953. It is found in Algeria.

References

Moths described in 1953
Agonopterix
Moths of Africa